Catantops is a genus of grasshoppers in the tribe Catantopini and is typical of the subfamily Catantopinae.  Species can be found in Africa, including Madagascar and subcontinental India.

Species  

The Orthoptera Species File lists:
 Catantops annexus Bolívar, 1917
 Catantops australis Jago, 1984
 Catantops brevipennis Wintrebert, 1972
 Catantops erubescens (Walker, 1870)
 Catantops humeralis (Thunberg, 1815)
 Catantops ituriensis Rehn, 1914
 Catantops janus Rehn, 1914
 Catantops kasengo Jago, 1994
 Catantops magnicercus Uvarov, 1953
 Catantops melanostictus Schaum, 1853 - type species
 Catantops minor Dirsh, 1956
 Catantops modestus Karny, 1917
 Catantops momboensis Sjöstedt, 1931
 Catantops nephiostictus Jago, 1984
 Catantops ochthephilus Jago, 1984
 Catantops parasylvestris Jago, 1984
 Catantops stenocrobyloides Karny, 1907
 Catantops stramineus (Walker, 1870)
 Catantops sylvestris Jago, 1984
 Catantops tanganus Dirsh, 1956
 Catantops terminalis Ramme, 1929
 Catantops trimaculatus Uvarov, 1953
 Catantops unimaculata Mahmood, Yousuf & Khaliq, 2002

Synonyms 
The names Catantops debilis Krauss 1901 and Catantops elegans Karny, 1907 are synonyms for Cryptocatantops debilis (Krauss, 1901).

References

External links 
 
 

Acrididae genera
Taxa named by Hermann Rudolph Schaum
Catantopinae 
Orthoptera of Asia
Orthoptera of Africa